Columbus Civic Center is a 10,000-seat multi-purpose arena in Columbus, Georgia, built in 1996.

History

The arena was built in 1996, along with a Softball Complex, to fully complete South Commons (an area consisting of a baseball and football stadium, and a skateboard park). The venue replaced the Municipal Auditorium, which was constructed in 1955.

Events
The Columbus Civic Center is home to the Columbus Lions indoor football team and the Columbus River Dragons professional ice hockey team. The Civic Center also hosts some Auburn Tigers collegiate ice hockey games when the Columbus Ice Rink next door is unavailable. Several other sports teams have also used the arena in the past. The Columbus Cottonmouths ice hockey team played in the arena from 1996 until 2017; the Columbus Riverdragons basketball team from 2001 to 2005; the Columbus Wardogs indoor football team from 2001 to 2004; the Chattahoochee Valley Vipers indoor football team in 2006; and the Columbus Comets indoor soccer team in 1997.

On October 10 to the 11th, Barney, and his friends: Baby Bop & BJ, and their new friend, Riff performed here in Barney Live! - The Let's Go Tour which was supposed to be filmed here and released on video, but it never happened.

The arena is also the primary concert venue in the Greater Columbus area, hosting artists such as KISS (in 1997), Kelly Clarkson (in 2009), and Lady Antebellum (in 2012). The Civic Center has also hosted several professional wrestling events, such as WWE's Friday Night Smackdown (in 2006 and 2014), and WCW Monday Nitro (in 1996).

References

External links
 Columbus Civic Center Official Website

Basketball venues in Georgia (U.S. state)
College ice hockey venues in the United States
Indoor ice hockey venues in the United States
Indoor arenas in Georgia (U.S. state)
Indoor soccer venues in the United States
Sports venues in Columbus, Georgia
Sports venues completed in 1996
Auburn Tigers
Columbus Riverdragons
1996 establishments in Georgia (U.S. state)